In electrical engineering, IEC 60269 is a set of technical standards for low-voltage power fuses. The standard is in four volumes, which describe general requirements, fuses for industrial and commercial applications, fuses for residential applications, and fuses to protect semiconductor devices. The IEC standard unifies several national standards, thereby improving the interchangeability of fuses in international trade. All fuses of different technologies tested to meet IEC standards will have similar time-current characteristics, which simplifies design and maintenance.
 IEC 60269-1 – Low-voltage fuses – Part 1: General requirements
 IEC 60269-2 – Low-voltage fuses – Part 2: Supplementary requirements for fuses for use by authorized persons (fuses mainly for industrial application) – Examples of standardized systems of fuses A to I
 IEC 60269-3 – Low-voltage fuses – Part 3: Supplementary requirements for fuses for use by unskilled persons (fuses mainly for household and similar applications) – Examples of standardized systems of fuses A to F
 IEC 60269-4 – Low-voltage fuses – Part 4: Supplementary requirements for fuse-links for the protection of semiconductor devices
 IEC 60269-5 – Low-voltage fuses – Part 5: Guidance for the application of low-voltage fuses
 IEC 60269-6 – Low-voltage fuses – Part 6: Supplementary requirements for fuse-links for the protection of solar photovoltaic energy systems
 IEC 60269-7 – Low-voltage fuses – Part 7: Supplementary requirements for fuse-links for the protection of batteries and battery systems

In IEC standards, the replaceable element is called a fuse link and the assembly of fuse link and fuse holder is called a fuse. North American standards call the replaceable element only the fuse.

Application categories and time-current characteristics

IEC 60269 unifies the electrical characteristics of fuses that are dimensionally interchangeable with fuses built to earlier British, German, French or Italian standards. The standard identifies application categories which classify the time-current characteristic of each type of fuse. The application category is a two-digit code.
 The first letter is a if the fuse is for short-circuit protection only; an associated device must provide overload protection.
 The first letter is g if the fuse is intended to operate even with currents as low as those that cause it to blow in one hour. These are considered general-purpose fuses for protection of wires.

The second letter indicates the type of equipment or system to be protected:
 D – North American time-delay fuses for motor circuits, UL 248 fuses
 G – General purpose protection of wires and cables
 M – Motors
 N – Conductors sized to North American practice, UL 248 fuses
 PV – Solar photovoltaic arrays as per 60269-6
 R, S – Rectifiers or semiconductors as per 60269-5
 Tr – Transformers 

Any fuses built to the IEC 60269 standard and carrying the same application category (for example, gG or aM) will have similar electrical characteristics, time-current characteristics, and power dissipation as any other, even if the fuses are made in the packages standardized to the earlier national standards. Fuses of the same application category can be substituted for each other provided the voltage rating of the circuit does not exceed the fuse rating.

The tests recommended on Fuses by IEC 60269 are:
 Temperature rise & power dissipation test
 Non-fusing & Fusing test
 Verification of rated current test
 Overload test
 Verification of Time Current Characteristics and Gates

D type fuses
D-type (Diazed) fuse cartridges have a bottle-shaped ceramic body with metal end caps and are fitted in screw-in fuse holders. They are available in five different body sizes, with ratings from 2 A up to 200 A (see table). The designation of a size consists of the letter D and a Roman numeral. Higher-voltage types rated up to 750 V have increased clearance distances and are longer than lower-voltage-rated fuses. They are available with interrupting ratings up to 50kA RMS, and are intended for use as incoming main protection from an electrical supply utility.

D0-type (Neozed) fuses are similar but have a smaller, cylindrical body. They are available in three different sizes with ratings from 2 A up to 100 A (see table).

Fuseholders may be secured by screws to a panel, attached to bus bars, or mounted on DIN rails. For the Neozed fuses, there are also fuse bases with integrated disconnecting switches. Changing fuses with the circuit off increases the safety of the user. With new versions of these load disconnecting switches, the fuse cartridges are no longer screwed, but are held by spring clips.

Traditional Diazed fuse holders are made as a conducting metal envelope covered with non-conducting porcelain cover. Under mechanical stress it is possible for the cover to crack partially or fully, uncovering the conducting element. It may happen if a fuse holder was accidentally dropped or someone was using too much force to screw it in. Uncovered metal envelopes present a serious risk of shock and should be replaced immediately under extreme precautions by trained personnel.

The smaller end cap (the "top" of the bottle) has a diameter that varies with the fuse rating: higher ratings have wider end caps. The fixed part of the fuse holder contains a (usually colour-coded) gauge ring, which will accept end caps up to a certain diameter. It is therefore not possible to fit a fuse of a higher rating than allowed for by the gauge ring. The size of the gauge ring is determined by the current rating of the circuit to be protected. Gauge rings are intended to be changed only by authorized personnel.

The larger end cap (the "bottom" of the bottle) has at its centre a small spring-loaded button retained by a thin wire, which serves as a "fuse blown" indicator. When the fuse blows, the wire breaks and the indicator button is ejected by the spring. A missing or displaced indicator thus pinpoints a blown fuse. The removable part of the fuse holder has a small window to allow inspection of the indicator without removal of the fuse. The indicator button usually has a coloured dot indicating the fuse rating (see table).

D- and D0-type fuses are used for protection of circuits up to 500 V AC in residential and commercial installations, and occasionally for the protection of electric motors. The most common operating class is gG (general purpose, formerly gL), but other classes are available. A gG class fuse will typically blow within 2–5 seconds at five times the rated current, and within 0.1–0.2 seconds at ten times the rated current.

D-system (DIAZED)

 The sizes D IV and D V are rarely used
 D I and D V are not part of IEC 60269 (meet outdated national standards)

D0-System (NEOZED)
Fuses of the D0 system (read as D zero) or NEOZED are smaller than the DIAZED fuses. NEOZED fuses are divided into three sizes.

The D03 size is used very rarely, because with these high currents NH fuses have proven to be more reliable. In circuits with a very high prospective short-circuit current level (more than 50kA), D-fuses cannot be used and type NH fuses are used instead.

NH fuses

NH fuses  have a square or oblong body and blade-style terminals. These fuses are larger and have higher ratings than the screw type fuses, exceeding 100 kA. NH fuses are widespread in industrial plants as well as in public mains electricity applications, e.g., in electrical substations and electrical distribution boards, or in house junction boxes in buildings.

NH fuses can be changed with power on the circuit, but this requires special training, special tools, and personal protective equipment. An isolation protection mat and isolating gloves may be necessary. Pulling any fuse cartridge under load can cause an electric arc, which may cause serious and fatal injuries without protection equipment. NH disconnecting switches facilitate the safety of cartridge replacement.

NH fuses are manufactured in several current rating ranges.

British domestic fuses

In British residential installations, cylindrical fuses with a diameter of  inch and a length of 1 inch (Ø 6.3 × 25.4 mm) in compliance with British Standard BS 1362 are found inside a standard UK 13 A plug. The specification calls for sand-filled fuses with a ceramic body and metallic contacts at the ends with a 5.5 mm length.

References

External links
 

Electrical standards
60269